
Saldanha man also known as Saldanha cranium or Elandsfontein cranium are fossilized remains of an archaic human. It is one of the key specimens for Homo heidelbergensis. It has not been dated directly, and is estimated to be roughly 0.5 million years old.
The remains, which included a fragment of lower jaw, were found on an exposed surface between shifting sand dunes on the farm Elandsfontein, which is located near Hopefield, South Africa.

It was found associated with a variety of fossil vertebrates, and initially classified as Homo saldanensis (Drennan 1955).
Singer (1954) noted close resemblance to Kabwe 1 at Broken Hill (Zambia) and LH 18 at Laetoli (Tanzania).
Comparison with Kabwe 1 specifically, and thus classification as African H. heidelbergensis (H. rhodesiensis) was also regularly supported by later authors.

See also
 List of human fossils

References

Notes

Citations

Sources

1953 archaeological discoveries
Homo heidelbergensis fossils
Prehistoric South Africa